The following is a list of residents or political agents of the East India Company to the court of the Mughal emperor in Delhi from 1803 to 1857. A resident or political agent was an official of the East India Company (and after 1813, the British Government), who was based in a princely state and who served as part-diplomat, part-adviser to the native ruler, and part monitor of activities in the princely state.  He was an instrument of indirect rule of princely India by the British.

List

Notes

References

Delhi-related lists
Delhi Residency
Residents or Political Agents in Delhi, 1803-1857
Diplomats by role
Gubernatorial titles
Spies by role
19th century in Delhi
19th-century spies
Lists of office-holders in the British Empire
British India-related lists